The SKT Skyrider 06 is a Swiss helicopter, designed and produced by SKT Swiss Kopter Technology SA of Ambrì. It was first flown in 2013 and entered series production in January 2014. The aircraft is supplied complete and ready-to-fly.

Design and development
The Skyrider development was started in December 2011. In June 2013 the company was formed to produce the aircraft and the first production examples were completed in January 2014.

The design features a single main rotor and tail rotor, a two-seats-in side-by-side configuration enclosed cockpit with a windshield, skid landing gear and a four-cylinder, liquid-cooled, four stroke  Italian MW Fly B22 AeroPower piston engine.

The aircraft fuselage is made from steel tubing, with a carbon fibre composite cockpit and tailboom.

Reviewer Werner Pfaendler, describes it as an "elegant design".

Operational history
By January 2018 one example had been registered in Canada with Transport Canada under the Special Certificate of Airworthiness Limited category.

Specifications (Skyrider)

See also
List of rotorcraft

References

External links

Skyrider
2010s Swiss civil utility aircraft
2010s Swiss helicopters
Aircraft first flown in 2013